RK Nagar is a 2019 Indian Tamil-language political satire film written and directed by Saravana Rajan. The film stars Vaibhav, Sana Althaf, and Anjena Kirti, while Sampath Raj and Inigo Prabhakaran and Uriyadi Chandra Kumar play supporting roles. Featuring music composed by Premgi Amaren, the film released on 17 December 2019 on Netflix even though it aimed to have a theatrical release.

Director Saravana Rajan has clarified that the film is not political, but according to the recent release of teaser, it shows multitudes of political scenarios which took place in Tamil Nadu during the period of 2015–2017.

Plot
Shankar (Vaibhav), is introduced in a dream song sequence, he dreams of living a luxurious life with two wives at his service. When he wakes up, his ambition is entirely different, Shankar claims that he has no interest in making wealth and has no respect for people of fortune. Ranjini (Sana Althaf) comes from a rich background and despises rowdy men, but when she sees Shankar chasing two goons with a machete in his hand, she falls for him. Meanwhile, there a conflict between two rivals, Vishwanathan aka Lottai (Sampath Raj) and Manoj aka Mannu (Inigo Prabhakaran). Mannu is the nephew of the chairman. However, Lottai is killed by Mannu, and the chairman's son is too killed in Shankar's new tailor shop, causing him to get framed for murder. How Shankar use his ways to prove himself that he is not involved in the murder forms the rest of the story.

Cast 

 Vaibhav as Shankar
 Sana Althaf as Ranjini
 Anjena Kirti as Kamatchi
 Sampath Raj as Vishwanathan aka Lottai
 Inigo Prabhakaran as Manoj aka Mannu
 Subbu Panchu as Inspector Nagendran
 Santhana Bharathi as Chairman Sundaramoorthy
 T. Siva as Chairman Damodaran
 Shreekumar as Bharani
 Kutty Gopi as Shankar's friend
 Vichu as Manager Velu
 Sandhana Lakshmi as Sivagami, Shankar's mother
 Srilatha as Ranjini's mother
 Sree as Akash
 Akash Nath as Santhanu
 Uriyadi Chandru as Govindaraj
 Karthik Nagarajan as Thandalkar
 Stills Pandiyan as Politician
 Winner Ramachandran as Police Commissioner
 Amirthalingam as Head Constable
 Kumara Vadivel as School Principal
 Vicky as Export Company Dealer
 Naveen as Senthil (tailor shop boy)
 Pradeep
 Akash Premkumar
 Karunakaran in a guest appearance
 Premgi Amaren in a guest appearance

Production 
In early May 2017, Venkat Prabhu announced that he would be producing a film titled RK Nagar, which would be directed by Saravana Rajan, who had previously made Vadacurry (2014). Vaibhav was cast in the lead role, with Sana Althaf signed to portray the lead actress and Sampath Raj chosen to portray the antagonist. Premgi Amaren, Praveen K. L., Vasuki Bhaskar, and S. Venkatesh were announced to be a part of the film's crew. Denying reports that the film was based on a political story, Saravana Rajan revealed the film would feature four narratives and compared the script to Maanagaram (2017). The film began production in June 2017 and was shot across Chennai and Pondicherry.

Soundtrack 

The music was composed by Premgi Amaren, and rights were acquired by Muzik 247. Lyrics for the songs are written by Gangai Amaren, Vairamuthu, Karpaga Rajan, and Parthi Bhaskar.

Release 
After being delayed for over a year, the film was supposed to have its theatrical release in April 2019 but released directly on Netflix on 17 December 2019 before being taken down. The film got re-released on Netflix on 29 April 2020.

References

External links 
 

2010s Tamil-language films
2019 films
Films set in Chennai
Films shot in Chennai
Indian comedy films
Indian direct-to-video films
Films scored by Premgi Amaren
Indian political satire films
Tamil-language Netflix original films
2019 direct-to-video films
2019 comedy films